Secret Town may refer to:

Secret Town, California
The Secret Town, novels

See also
 Closed city